The Beautiful Game was the tenth full-length album by Acoustic Alchemy released in 2000, and marked a turning point in the career of guitarist Greg Carmichael.

This album was the first without founding member Nick Webb, who had died two years previously due to pancreatic cancer; duties on steel string guitar were now filled by understudy Miles Gilderdale, who remains in the post to this day.

The album came as a stark change to fans of the group. Glossy production and radically different songwriting brought about a new 21st century sound, completely adverse to the style built up over a decade and a half up until this point.

Experimentation was certainly a prominent factor in "The Beautiful Game". Tracks like "The Last Flamenco" brought drum and bass style synthesised loops, whilst "Kidstuff" employed a repeated sample of a baby giggling.

One of the band's longer efforts, the album lasts over an hour including two bonus tracks, featuring Greg Carmichael and John Parsons re-recording two of the tracks with a country and western style backing.

Track listing

Personnel
Studio:
 Producers: Richard Bull, Miles Gilderdale, Greg Carmichael, Steven Jones.
 Audio Mixers: Richard Bull; Steve Jones.
 Engineers include: Jim Sweeney, Richard Bull, Klaus Genuit.
Musicians:
 Miles Gilderdale (guitar, programming); 
 Greg Carmichael, John Parsons (guitar); 
 Jerry Douglas (dobro); 
 Sam Bush (violin); 
 Snake Davis (whistle, saxophone); 
 Al Richardson, Pat Burgeson (harmonica); 
 Guy Barker (trumpet); 
 Terry Disley, Tony White, Simon Hale, William Richardson (keyboards); 
 Frank Felix, Viktor Krauss (bass); 
 Frank Tontoh, Geoff Dunn, Larry Atamanuik (drums); 
 Scooter Delong (percussion); 
 Richard Bull, Tony White (programming).

References

Acoustic Alchemy albums
2000 albums